Epitherina is a monotypic moth genus in the family Geometridae described by Eugen Wehrli in 1938. Its only species, Epitherina kusnetzovi, was described by Jaan Viidalepp in 1992.

References

Geometridae
Monotypic moth genera